Pelayo Rodríguez may refer to:
Pelayo Rodríguez (bishop), Bishop of Iria Flavia, 977–985
Pelayo Rodríguez (count) (fl. 985–1007), count of the Kingdom of León
Pelayo Rodríguez (majordomo), majordomo of Alfonso VI of León and Castile, 1102–1107